National Action may refer to:

 National Action (Australia), a defunct political party
 National Action (Chile, 1963), a defunct political party
 National Action (Italy), a political party
 National Action (Malta), a defunct political party
 National Action (South Africa), a political party
 National Action, a historical political party in Spain, in 1932 renamed Popular Action (Spain)
 National Action (UK), a proscribed neo-Nazi organisation

See also
National Action Party (disambiguation)